Neapolitan Herder and a Cow leaving a Cave (French: Berger napolitain et bufflonne quittant une grotte) is a circa 1750 painting by the French artist Jean Barbault. It is now in the Musée des Beaux-Arts of Strasbourg, France. Its inventory number is 44.2009.2.1.

The painting, which was unpublished before its purchase by the museum, is considered as one of the masterpieces of Jean Barbault, a French painter later established in Rome, who died at the early age of 43.

While the real subject of the painting remains mysterious (does it depict a simple genre scene, or does it depict Io with Argus, or with Mercury?), the herder looks like a figure that appears at the right edge of Barbault's extravagant painting (measuring 37.7 × 392 cm [14.8 × 154 in] Mascarade des quatres parties du monde, now in the Musée des Beaux-Arts et d'Archéologie de Besançon, and may be a self-portrait.

References

External links 

Paintings in the collection of the Musée des Beaux-Arts de Strasbourg
1750 paintings
Oil paintings
Genre paintings
Rococo paintings
French paintings
Animal paintings
Cattle in art